The Connacht Junior Football Championship is a junior "knockout" competition in the game of Gaelic football played in the province of Connacht in Ireland. The series of games are organised by the Connacht Council. The competition began in 1906, with Mayo winning during the inaugural year. The most successful county to date is Mayo who have won on twenty nine occasions. The 2019 Connacht Junior Football champions are Galway. 
The winners of the Connacht Junior Football Championship each year progress to play the other provincial champions for a chance to win the All-Ireland Junior Football Championship.

Top winners

Roll of honour

 1992 Mayo represented Connacht in the All-Ireland Junior Football Championship semi-finals.
 1929 Refixture following an objection. Roscommon w/o Galway scratch

See also
Munster Junior Football Championship
Leinster Junior Football Championship
Ulster Junior Football Championship

References

Sources
 Roll of Honour on gaainfo.com
 Complete Roll of Honour on Kilkenny GAA bible

2
2